Aeromancy (from Greek ἀήρ aḗr, "air", and manteia, "divination") is divination conducted by interpreting atmospheric conditions. Alternate spellings include arologie, aeriology and aërology.

Practice
Aeromancy uses cloud formations, wind currents and cosmological events such as comets to attempt to divine the past, present or future. There are sub-types of this practice which are as follows: austromancy (wind divination), ceraunoscopy (observing thunder and lightning), chaomancy (aerial vision), meteormancy (meteors and shooting stars), and nephomancy (cloud divination).

History
The first recorded instance of the word aeromancy being used was found in Chambers, Cycl. Supp, 1753. It was defined as "That department of science which treats of the atmosphere", rather than a form of divination. However, variations on the word have been used throughout history with the earliest instance being in the Bible, though the practice is thought to have been used by the ancient Babylonian priests.

Damascius, the last of the Neoplatonists, records an account of nephomancy in the 5th century CE, during the reign of Leo I:

Cultural influence
Aeromancy was mentioned in Deuteronomy 18 as being condemned by Moses. It is also condemned by Albertus Magnus in Speculum Astronomiae, who describes the practice as a derivative of necromancy. The practice was debunked by Luis de Valladolid in his 1889 work Historia de vita et doctrina Alberti Magni.

In Renaissance magic, aeromancy was classified as one of the seven "forbidden arts," along with necromancy, geomancy, hydromancy, pyromancy, chiromancy (palmistry), and spatulamancy (scapulimancy).

In myth
Dyēus in Proto-Indo-European mythology
God in Abrahamic religions
Tinia, the Etruscan god of lightning
Adad, the Babylonian god of thunder, lightning, and prophesy
Aide, Basque goddess of the air[8]
Amun, the Egyptian god of wind, fertility, life, and secrets
Aditi, Hindu goddess of the sky
Agni, Hindu god of the fire
Thor, Norse god of thunder
Zeus, Greek god of the sky and thunder
Vayu, Persian yazata of the wind and atmosphere
Perun, Slavic god of thunder

References

Divination
Weather prediction